Hsieh Ying-xuan (born 31 December 1979) is a Taiwanese actress. She won the Best Leading Actress award at the 55th Golden Horse Awards for her role in Dear Ex (2018).

Filmography

Film

Television series

Awards and nominations

References

External links

1979 births
Living people
21st-century Taiwanese actresses
Taiwanese film actresses
Taiwanese television actresses
Taiwanese stage actresses